Joseph François may refer to:

 Joseph François (Haiti politician), Haitian minister of Justice
 Joseph François (Seychelles politician), member of the National Assembly of Seychelles
 Joseph Pascal François (1853–1914), Governor of French India
 Joseph Francois (economist), professor of international economics

See also
 Joseph-François
 François-Joseph